The Windsor Royals are a defunct Canadian Junior ice hockey club from Windsor, Nova Scotia.  They were members of the Nova Scotia Junior Hockey League and were 1998, 2001, and 2008 Don Johnson Cup Maritime Junior B champions.

History
Founded in 1967 as a member of the Metro Valley Junior B Hockey League, the team became a Junior A team in 1977 but folded only two years later.  They were the Metro Valley League's first ever champion in 1968.  After a five-year hiatus, the Royals came back to help the Mainland Junior B Hockey League and since 1984 have been a prominent member of the league.

The Royals are one of three teams to have won the Don Johnson Cup as Maritime Junior B Champions 3 times.  The other two are the Sackville Blazers and the St. John's Jr. 50's.

In 1998, the Royals were the Nova Scotia Junior B Champions.  With the win, the Royals went to Summerside, Prince Edward Island to compete for the Don Johnson Cup.  They made it all the way to the finals, where they met the New Brunswick Junior B Hockey League's Richibucto Bears and defeated them 4-2 to win their first Maritime Championship.

In 2001, the Royals were selected to be the host site of the Don Johnson Cup.  As host site, they were allowed to compete in the competition despite not winning their league.  They would go on to defeat their own league champion, the Strait Pirates, 3-1 in the championship game to win their second Maritime Junior B Championship.

In 2008, the Royals won their league and moved on to the Don Johnson Cup.  In their first game, they lost to the St. John's Jr. Celtics 7-4.  In Game 2, they then beat Dieppe-Memramcook Voyageurs (a Junior B team) from the New Brunswick Junior C Hockey League 6-3.  Windsor then lost 4-3 to the Island Junior Hockey League's Kensington Vipers 4-3, but beat the host team Sherwood Falcons 6-2 in the same day.  All five teams finished the round robin 2-2-0, but by virtue of goal differential the Royals finished first.  On April 19, in the semi-final the Royals defeated Dieppe-Memramcook 3-1 and on April 20 they again beat Sherwood 4-1 to clinch their third Don Johnson Cup.

In 2012, the team took a one-year leave of absence, and did not make a return the following year. The Windsor Royals are now defunct. The Valley Maple Leafs though have filled their void and now play in the Town of Windsor in the same arena

Season-by-season record

Season Statistics

1995-1996 NS Jr. B Hockey League Champions

External links
Royals Website

Ice hockey teams in Nova Scotia
Ice hockey clubs established in 1967
1967 establishments in Nova Scotia
2011 disestablishments in Nova Scotia
Sports clubs disestablished in 2011